Labeobarbus aspius (Drakensberg minnow) is a species of cyprinid fish endemic to the Congo Democratic Republic.

References

aspius
Cyprinid fish of Africa
Endemic fauna of the Democratic Republic of the Congo
Taxa named by George Albert Boulenger
Fish described in 1912